Dabiri is an Indian ethnic fashion brand. Dabiri may also refer to
Dabiri (surname)
Dabiri Tabriz FSC, an Iranian futsal club